Castle Square is a square in Beirut, Lebanon, named after Beirut Castle that stood nearby until demolition in the late 19th century. 

Remains of a western extension of the castle are preserved within the square.

Timeline

 8th century: Reinforcement of the Tell with a fortress.  
 Crusader period: A 6-meter-wide moat separated the southwestern tower from the lower city, protecting the castle from attacks.
 1827 and 1840: Heavy naval bombardments rendered the castle obsolete. 
 1890s: The fort and the castle promontory were demolished to construct a road and railway.
 2010: Excavation for the construction of Castle Square revealed a western extension of the Crusader Castle.

See also

 Beirut Castle
 Martyrs' Square, Beirut

References 
 Antaki, Patricia (2001) “The Crusader Castle of Beirut”, in: Beirut: History and Archaeology, Proceedings of ARAM Twelfth International Conference (American University of Beirut Lebanon 13-16 April 1999), Aram 13-14:  323-353.
 Davie, Michael F. (1985) «Trois cartes inédites de Beyrouth», Annales de Géographie de l'Universite Saint-Joseph 5:37-82.
 Davie, Michael F.  (1987) “Maps and the historical topography of Beirut”, Berytus 35: 141-163.

Monuments and memorials in Lebanon
Squares in Beirut